John Myles Bennett (19 July 1942 – 8 October 2019) was an Australian politician. He was born in Hobart, Tasmania, and held a Bachelor of Law. In the 1986 state election, he was elected to the Tasmanian House of Assembly as a Liberal member for Denison, and he served as a minister from 1986 to 1989. Bennett resigned from parliament on 30 January 1990.

References

1942 births
2019 deaths
Liberal Party of Australia members of the Parliament of Tasmania
Members of the Tasmanian House of Assembly